The 2011–12 Championnat National season was the 14th since its establishment. The previous season's champions was Bastia. The league schedule was announced on 16 May 2011 and the fixtures were determined in July. The season began on 6 August 2011 and ended on 26 May 2012. The winter break was in effect from 23 December to 6 January.

Teams 

There will be four promoted teams from the Championnat de France amateur, the fourth division of French football, replacing the five teams that were relegated from the Championnat National following the 2010–11 season. A total of 20 teams will compete in the league with four clubs suffering relegation to the Championnat de France amateur. All clubs that secure league status for the season will be subject to approval by the DNCG before becoming eligible to participate.

Grenoble became the first professional club to fall to the Championnat National from Ligue 2. The club's drop occurred on 13 May 2011 without it even playing a match following positive results from clubs Grenoble had been trailing in the table. Grenoble will be returning to the third division after playing over a decade under the Ligue de Football Professionnel emblem in Ligue 1 and Ligue 2. On 20 May, both Nîmes and Vannes completed the trio of Ligue 2 clubs dropping down to the third division. Nîmes will be returning to National after three seasons playing in Ligue 2, while Vannes will regress back to the third division after two seasons.

On 7 May 2011, despite having the week off, Le Poiré-sur-Vie became the first club from the Championnat de France amateur to achieve promotion from the fourth division to the Championnat National. The club's spot in the third division was confirmed following second-place Les Herbiers' 0–0 draw with the reserve team of professional club Lorient. Le Poiré-sur-Vie will be making its debut in the third division having spent, aside from six seasons in the fifth and fourth division, its entire history languishing in the regional leagues of Centre-Ouest and Atlantique. Two weeks later, both Besançon and Gazélec Ajaccio were promoted to the Championnat National after recording victories during the match day. Besançon will be returning to the third division after spending six seasons in the Championnat de France amateur, while Gazélec will be returning to the league after spending four seasons in the fourth division. On the final day of the season, Quevilly became the final club in the CFA to earn promotion to National after drawing with Poissy. Despite drawing, the two points Quevilly earned from the match was enough to edge Red Star Paris, which also drew during the week.

Teams relegated to Championnat National
 Vannes
 Nîmes
 Grenoble

Teams promoted to Championnat National
 Besançon
 Cherbourg
 Épinal
 Gazélec Ajaccio
 Le Poiré-sur-Vie
 Martigues
 Quevilly
 Red Star

DNCG rulings 

On 26 May 2011, following a preliminary review of each club's administrative and financial accounts in the Championnat National, the DNCG ruled that Pacy Vallée-d'Eure, Strasbourg, Gap, Grenoble, and Cannes would be relegated to the Championnat de France amateur after the organisation determined that the clubs were enduring financial difficulties. The clubs had the option to appeal the ruling. On 24 June 2011, Pacy Vallée-d'Eure officials confirmed in a press conference that it would accept its relegation to the fourth division in an effort to smooth over its €350,000 debt into next year. Two weeks later, Grenoble confirmed on its website that the Appeals Board of the DNCG had informed club officials that it will be relegated to the fourth division. Grenoble, subsequently, entered liquidation on 7 July. On 13 July, Grenoble's relegation was validated after the French Football Federation confirmed via letter to SAS Épinal that the club would be replacing Grenoble in the Championnat National.

On 8 July 2011, the Appeals Board of the DNCG confirmed that both Strasbourg and Gap would remain relegated after the clubs failed to convince the board of its intent to fix its financial liabilities. Strasbourg has a deficit of over €4 million, while Gap's debt has exceeded over €80,000. Following the appeal denial, Gap officials announced that the club would appeal to the CNOSF, the National Sporting Committee of France. On 18 July, despite both clubs still having the option to appeal the DNCG rulings, the Ligue du Football Amateur (LFA) announced that Red Star and Cherbourg would replace Strasbourg and Gap, respectively, for the 2011–12 edition of the Championnat National. On the following day, Cannes had its appeal to remain in the Championnat National rejected by the DNCG. Similar to Gap, following the decision, Cannes announced its intent to appeal the ruling at the CNOSF. On 29 July, the CNOSF gave a favourable ruling for Cannes recommending to the federation that Cannes should remain in the third division. On 3 August, the CNOSF ruled Gap confirmed the demotion of Gap to the Championnat de France amateur. The French Football Federation determined whether Cannes would be allowed to participate in the league on 4 August, one day before the season was set to begin at the federation's annual executive meeting. At the meeting, the Federation re-affirmed its decision to relegate Cannes to the CFA stating it "trust the DNCG and followed its decisions".

Stadia and locations

Personnel and kits 

Note: Flags indicate national team as has been defined under FIFA eligibility rules. Players and managers may hold more than one non-FIFA nationality.

1 Subject to change prior to the start of the season.

Managerial changes

League table

Results

Statistics

Top goalscorers 

Last updated: 3 May 2012Source: Official Goalscorers' Standings

Notes

References

External links 
 Official site

2011-12
3
Fra